Hollywood Suite is a group of four Canadian specialty channels, each either majority-owned or wholly owned by Hollywood Suite Inc., a privately held broadcasting company based in Toronto, Ontario.

The four channels are primarily devoted to classic films, with each of the four channels devoted to a specific decade. Additionally, the networks air a select number of current-day scripted television series, award shows, and original non-scripted series, regardless of their decade demarcations.

Its channels are separately licensed services (in contrast to competing premium television services in Canada, which at the time of launch, were Category A-licensed and whose additional channels are treated as multiplex channels operating under a single CRTC license), the four channels are typically bundled together in a single channel package.

History 
On July 2, 2010, Jay Switzer (co-founder of Hollywood Suite), was granted approval by the Canadian Radio-television and Telecommunications Commission (CRTC) for four new specialty channels, including "Velocity" and "Adventure", which would be "devoted to the entire genre of action and adventure, including selections from crime fiction, and epic and heroic drama." as well as "KISS" and "The Love Channel", which would both be "devoted to romance, love and relationships."

The four channels launched on November 23, 2011 under the blanket branding Hollywood Suite, with all four channels typically distributed as a single package; the channels were marketed as providing a "pure" and "high quality" service at a lower cost in comparison to other premium television services in Canada.

Channels 
Hollywood Suite consists of four multiplex channels focusing on films, and in some cases TV series, from the 1970s (and earlier), 1980s, 1990s, and 2000s (and later) respectively. The service also offers a video on-demand channel, as well as TV Everywhere app Hollywood Suite Go.

The four channels were previously formatted with either a theme, or featuring films from specific studios under brand licensing agreements; they originally launched as WarnerFilms (focusing on Warner Bros. productions), MGM Channel (focusing primarily on MGM films), Hollywood Storm (which focused primarily on action-oriented films), and Hollywood Festival (which focused primarily on romantic films). On May 31, 2012, Hollywood Suite announced it had reached a partnership with Sony Pictures Television to re-launch Hollywood Storm and Hollywood Festival as AXN Movies and Sony Movie Channel respectively. At the time of the rebrand, AXN Investments took a 46.66% ownership in the two channels. The rebrand occurred on September 4, 2012.

In September 2015, Hollywood Suite announced that it would re-launch its channels on November 2, 2015, dropping the studio-based brands in favour of dedicating each channel to a specific decade.

Free previews for all four Hollywood Suite channels occur during December to early January, on every major TV provider, but as premium channels are apt to be bundled into tiers by Canada's major providers and not offered separately, only a few smaller providers which still offer them under premium pricing carry these preview periods.

Ownership 

According to CRTC records , the largest shareholders in Hollywood Suite Inc. are actress Ellen Dubin (widow of previous co-owner Jay Switzer) at 22.11%, Farmhouse Productions owner Kent Sobey (a relative of deceased previous shareholder Donald Sobey) at 15.38%, and ThinkFilm founder Jeff Sackman at 14.23%, with other shareholders holding combined interests of 50.05%.

Sony subsidiary AXN Investments holds a net 46.66% interest in a subsidiary which owns the 90s and 00s Movies channels (formerly AXN Movies and Sony Movie Channel respectively), with the 70s and 80s Movies channels remaining wholly owned by Hollywood Suite.

References

External links
 

Companies based in Toronto
Television broadcasting companies of Canada
Movie channels in Canada
Digital cable television networks in Canada
Television channels and stations established in 2011
Commercial-free television networks
HD-only channels